The 1938 Tulane Green Wave football team represented Tulane University as a member of the Southeastern Conference (SEC) during the 1938 college football season. Led by third-year head coach Red Dawson, the Green Wave played their home games at Tulane Stadium in New Orleans. Tulane finished the season with an overall record of 7–2–1 and a mark of 4–1–1 in conference play, tying for second in the SEC.

Schedule

References

Tulane
Tulane Green Wave football seasons
Tulane Green Wave football